Émile Henry may refer to:

 Emile Henry (ceramic), a French manufacturer of ceramic products
 Émile Henry (anarchist) (1872–1894), French anarchist